Locha is a moth genus in the family Geometridae erected by Francis Walker in 1854.

Species
 Locha hyalaria (Herrich-Schäffer, [1855])
 Locha hyalina (Walker, 1854)
 Locha panopea (Thierry-Mieg, 1892)
 Locha phocusa (Druce, 1893)
 Locha posthumaria (Herrich-Schäffer, [1855])

References

Ennominae